Simms is a census-designated place (CDP) in Muskogee County, Oklahoma, United States. The population was 295 at the 2000 census.

Geography
Simms is located at  (35.403769, -95.152930).

Demographics

As of the census of 2000, there were 295 people, 105 households, and 87 families residing in the CDP. The population density was 20.9 people per square mile (8.1/km2). There were 110 housing units at an average density of 7.8/sq mi (3.0/km2). The racial makeup of the CDP was 55.93% White, 33.56% Native American, 0.34% Asian, 0.68% from other races, and 9.49% from two or more races. Hispanic or Latino of any race were 1.69% of the population.

There were 105 households, out of which 41.0% had children under the age of 18 living with them, 68.6% were married couples living together, 10.5% had a female householder with no husband present, and 16.2% were non-families. 11.4% of all households were made up of individuals, and 4.8% had someone living alone who was 65 years of age or older. The average household size was 2.81 and the average family size was 3.08.

In the CDP, the population was spread out, with 29.5% under the age of 18, 10.2% from 18 to 24, 24.7% from 25 to 44, 25.4% from 45 to 64, and 10.2% who were 65 years of age or older. The median age was 36 years. For every 100 females, there were 100.7 males. For every 100 females age 18 and over, there were 100.0 males.

The median income for a household in the CDP was $20,804, and the median income for a family was $21,696. Males had a median income of $26,500 versus $13,750 for females. The per capita income for the CDP was $8,529. About 19.5% of families and 21.6% of the population were below the poverty line, including 22.8% of those under the age of eighteen and 22.2% of those 65 or over.

References

Census-designated places in Muskogee County, Oklahoma
Census-designated places in Oklahoma